Brefeldia is an genus of slime molds in the family Amaurochaetaceae.

The genus name of Brefeldia is in honour of Julius Oscar Brefeld (1839 – 1925), a German botanist and mycologist.

The genus was circumscribed by Józef Tomasz Rostafínsky in 1873 and appears to be monotypic, containing the species Brefeldia maxima

References

External links

Myxogastria
Amoebozoa genera